Judge Putnam may refer to:

Richard Johnson Putnam (1913–2002), judge of the United States District Court for the Western District of Louisiana
William LeBaron Putnam (1835–1918), judge of the United States Court of Appeals for the First Circuit